St Helens R.F.C. Hall of Fame honours past players who have graced the club from their inception in 1873. In their 137 year history, St Helens have won no fewer than 12 league titles and 12 Challenge Cups, as well as honours like the Rugby League Premiership, the BBC2 Floodlit Trophy and the John Player Trophy, and the players that have and continue to make the success at the club possible range from home-grown talents turned into legends, and foreign greats that signed for the club due to its already massive and still growing reputation. There is a 300-game minimum requirement from inductees. The most recent addition to the Hall of Fame is Australian Phil Veivers, whose 12-year service was acknowledged in 2011; and in doing so, became the first Australian to be inducted into the Saints Hall of Fame.

Members
The forty-five strong hall of fame is:

References

Hall
Rugby league museums and halls of fame
Halls of fame in England